Basketball at the 2011 Summer Universiade was scheduled to be held from August 13 to August 22 in Shenzhen, China. In total, 40 teams will compete in the 2011 Summer Universiade (24 men's teams and 16 women's teams).

Medal summary

Medal table

Events

Men

Teams

Women

Teams

References

 
Summer Universiade
Basketball
2011
Universiade